The 1980 Jackson State Tigers football team represented Jackson State University as a member of the Southwestern Athletic Conference (SWAC) during the 1980 NCAA Division I-AA football season. Led by fifth-year head coach W. C. Gorden, the Tigers compiled and overall record of 8–3 with a mark of 5–1 in conference play, sharing the SWAC title with Grambling State.

Schedule

References

Jackson State
Jackson State Tigers football seasons
Southwestern Athletic Conference football champion seasons
Jackson State Tigers football